Li (Life Inspired) was a 24-hour Asian lifestyle high-definition television network in Malaysia and Singapore was officially launched on 18 August 2009, Li airs lifestyle-related programmes such as food, home, wellness, travel and style.

The channel is owned by Li TV International Limited and operated by Li TV Asia Sdn Bhd, with its operating headquarters in Kuala Lumpur, Malaysia and regional operating offices in Singapore and Hong Kong.

The channel is not available in the Philippines and Vietnam.

Star Publications Sdn Bhd acts as the airtime sales agent for the channel. Hence, the channel's schedule appears on The Star's TV guide.

On 12 July 2017, Li TV officially announced that its last or final television broadcast would be in October the same year, and the television channel ceased telecast transmission with a closing ceremony at midnight on 7 October 2017 at 00:00 MST/SST. The closure was due to losses incurred and headwinds in the media industry - it had reported losses of US$1.62 million (RM6.96 million) for the financial year ending on the last day of 2017.

Programming 
The channels airs international content (programmes from Australia, Europe and the United States), as well as Asia content.

Li will feature six content belts:
Li Ultimate – prime time programmes
Li Body – wellness programmes
Li Savour – food programmes
Li East – Asian programmes
Li Chic – style programmes
Li Space – home programmes

References

External links
 Official website
 Program Guide

Television in Malaysia
Television stations in Indonesia
Television stations in Singapore
Television channels and stations established in 2009
Television channels and stations disestablished in 2017
Mass media in Kuala Lumpur